The 1961–62 season was the 60th season of competitive football played by Dundee. Dundee finished in first place in Division One, winning their first (and to date only) Scottish League Championship. A 20-game unbeaten streak (17 of those being wins, 10 consecutive) served as the backbone for the Dark Blues most successful season ever. Dundee wrapped up the title in the final game of the season at Muirton Park, home of local rivals St Johnstone. In a triumphant day for those in dark blue, Alan Gilzean scored twice and Andy Penman got one of his own to ensure a comfortable 0–3 victory, simultaneously relegating St Johnstone and confirming Dundee as champions.

Scottish Division One

Statistics provided by Dee Archive.

League table 
dundee 12th

Scottish League Cup

Statistics provided by Dee Archive.

Group 3 table

Scottish Cup 

Statistics provided by Dee Archive.

Squad and statistics

First team squad

Player statistics 
Statistics provided by Dee Archive

|}

See also
 1961–62 in Scottish football

References

Scottish football championship-winning seasons
Dundee F.C. seasons
Dundee